Emiliana Mangue Mba Avomo is an Equatoguinean footballer who played in the 2011 FIFA Women's World Cup.

International career
In 2011, she joined at the last moment the Equatoguinean senior team for the 2011 FIFA Women's World Cup, replacing the sanctioned Jade.

References

External links

1991 births
Living people
Equatoguinean women's footballers
Women's association footballers not categorized by position
Equatorial Guinea women's international footballers
2011 FIFA Women's World Cup players
Footballers at the 2010 Summer Youth Olympics